Ascensión is a city in northern Chihuahua, Mexico.  Its population in the 2010 census was 13,456 inhabitants. The city is the capital of Ascensión Municipality.

Climate 
Its geographic condition combined with high altitude gives a cold semi-arid climate (Köppen: BSk) with very hot summers even with elevation due to dryness of air and absence of cold clouds and winter for the location or sometimes even there are places to the north.

Sister City
Ascensión has one sister city.:
 - Mesilla, New Mexico, USA

Notes

References

Populated places in Chihuahua (state)